The Shanghai–Zhengzhou high-speed train are high-speed train services between Shanghai and Zhengzhou, the capital of Henan Province. Trains are operated by CR Shanghai and CR Zhengzhou.

History

The CRH services between Shanghai and Zhengzhou started on 10 September 2007,  when the D-series trains commenced operations between the two cities on Beijing–Shanghai railway (later Beijing–Shanghai HSR) and Longhai railway. 

The high-speed train services (G-series trains) between Shanghai and Zhengzhou was commenced on 10 September 2016, with the inauguration of the Zhengzhou–Xuzhou HSR (part of Xuzhou–Lanzhou HSR). On the same day, the D-series trains stopped services.

Operations
The travelling time of the trains is less than four hours (3h 57m-3h 59m). Other trains are services with more stops and longer travelling time.

According to the train numbering rules of China Railway, odd numbers are for south or west bound trains and even numbers are for north or east bound trains. The trains from Shanghai to Zhengzhou travel northbound on Beijing–Shanghai HSR and westbound on Xuzhou–Lanzhou HSR, and the trains from Zhengzhou to Shanghai travel eastbound on Xuzhou–Lanzhou HSR and southbound on Beijing–Shanghai HSR. Therefore, all the train services on this route have 2 train numbers for the same service.

● : stop at the station
↓: pass the station
—: out of service range
  : Benchmark train

Shanghai → Zhengzhou
Via Xuzhou East

Via Hefei
G1826/1827: via Suzhou North, Wuxi East, Changzhou North, Nanjing South, Fuyang West and Zhoukou East

Zhengzhou → Shanghai
Via Xuzhou East

Via Hefei
G1804/1801: Zhoukou East, Jieshou South, Fuyang West, Yingshang North, Huainan South, Hefei, Nanjing South, Zhenjiang South, Suzhou North

Rolling stocks

The services are operated by CRH380B or CRH380BL trainsets.

Other services
The services between Shanghai and Xi'an (G359-362, G1911-1918 and G1920-1942), Lanzhou (G1972/1969 and G1970/1971), Chongqing (G1974/1975 and G1976/1973), and between Zhengzhou and Ningbo (G1866/1867 and G1868/1865) also provide services between Shanghai and Zhengzhou.

References

China Railway passenger services
Passenger rail transport in China
Railway services introduced in 2016